The İvriz relief is a Hittite rock relief in south-central Anatolia, located in the town of Aydınkent, formerly called İvriz (modern Turkey, Konya Province, about 17 km south-east of the modern town of Ereğli). The rock relief is on a rock face near the source of the İvriz Suyu, whose water has damaged the relief in modern times. It depicts the late 8th-century BC king Warpalawas and the storm-god Tarhunzas and is accompanied by a hieroglyphic Luwian inscription.  Rock reliefs are a prominent aspect of Hittite art. 

It is the best produced of the many Hittite rock reliefs and measures 4.2 m high by 2.4 m wide. It dates from the second half of the 8th century BC, the time of the Neo-Hittite-Aramean principalities. On the right hand side of the relief is king Warpalawas of Tuwana who stands on a stone platform with his hands raised in a gesture of greeting or worship. Opposite him at left stands the god Tarhunzas, who is depicted as much larger. Ripe stalks of wheat and grape clusters in his hands indicate that he brings about fertility. A sickle at his hip symbolises the time immediately before the harvest. The location of the relief on the cliff face of the İvriz Suyu suggests that the source of the fertility depicted on the relief was not the rare rains but the water which flowed from this spot almost all year. Thus, the spring could indicate the existence of a local spring cult.  In front of the god's face and behind the king's back are three lines of inscription in Luwian hieroglyphs, naming both figures. Another inscription at the base of the rock-face was probably two lines long, but it is badly worn.

During construction work on the weir in 1986, two further finds were made: a fragment of a stele of Tarhunzas, with a bilingual inscription in Luwian hieroglyphs and Phoenician (unpublished) saying that it was erected by Warpalawas and part of the head of a large statue, which probably also depicted Tarhunzas. These finds gave support to the idea that the location was a wealthy sanctuary of Tarhunzas patronised by Warpalawas. South of the cliff relief in the hills along the Ambar Deresi river, near Kızlar Sarayı (the ruins of a Byzantine abbey), is another relief, which is a copy of the İvriz relief. It is not so well carved and was never completely finished - the hieroglyphs are missing.

Modern history

The monument was described in Kâtip Çelebi (Hajji Khalifa)'s 17th-century geography. The Swedish-born French diplomat Jean Otter described the relief in his Voyage en Turquie... (1748), and was long said to be the first European to have seen it. But apparently he was depending on Kâtip Çelebi's text, and never saw it himself. The first European to actually visit it was a Major von Fischer in 1837.

References

Bibliography 
 Eberhard P. Rossner. Felsdenkmäler in der Türkei. Vol. 1: Die hethitischen Felsreliefs in der Türkei. Ein archäologischer Führer. 2nd revised edition. Rossner, München 1988, pp. 103–115.
Dinçol, Belkis; 1994. "New archaeological and epigraphical finds from Ivriz. A preliminary report." Tel Aviv Journal of Archaeology  21: pp. 117–128. 
 John David Hawkins. Corpus of Hieroglyphic Luwian Inscriptions. Vol. I: Inscriptions of the Iron Age. Part 2: Text. Amuq, Aleppo, Hama, Tabal, Assur Letters, Miscellaneous, Seals, Indices. Part 3: Plates. (= Studies in Indo-European Language and Culture 8). de Gruyter, Berlin. 2000, .
 Horst Ehringhaus. Das Ende, das ein Anfang war - Felsreliefs und Felsinschriften der luwischen Staaten Kleinasiens vom 12. bis 8./7. Jahrhundert v. Chr. Nünnerich-Asmus, Mainz 2014, pp. 48–61.

External links 

 Description on www.hittitemonuments.com

Tabal
Luwian mythology
Archaeological sites in the Mediterranean Region, Turkey
Konya Province
Hittite sites in Turkey
Hittite art
Luwian inscriptions
Phoenician inscriptions
Rock reliefs in Turkey
World Heritage Tentative List for Turkey